The Cormoș is a right tributary of the river Olt in Romania. It discharges into the Olt in Racoșul de Sus.

Tributaries

The following rivers are tributaries to the river Cormoș (from source to mouth):

Left: Chișag, Fierarul, Gherend, Coșag, Șar, Agriș, Hotarul
Right: Bătătura Cailor, Sic, Vârghiș, Rica

References

Rivers of Romania
Rivers of Covasna County
Rivers of Harghita County